The Paratriathlon at the 2016 Summer Paralympics – Men's PT1 event at the 2016 Paralympic Games took place at 11:20 on 10 September 2016 at Fort Copacabana.

Results

Source: 

Paratriathlon at the 2016 Summer Paralympics